KCalc is the software calculator integrated with the KDE Gear. In the default view it includes a number pad, buttons for adding, subtracting, multiplying, and dividing, brackets, memory keys, percent, reciprocal, factorial, square, and x to the power of y buttons.

Additional buttons for scientific and engineering (trigonometric and logarithmic functions), statistics and logic functions can be enabled as needed. 6 additional buttons can be predefined with mathematical constants and physical constants or custom values. It is ideal for calculations involving varying bases.

Since version 2 (included in KDE 3.5) KCalc offers arbitrary precision.

See also
 Comparison of software calculators
 GNOME Calculator

External links 

The KCalc Handbook

Free educational software
KDE Applications
Software calculators